Mesodasys is a genus of gastrotrichs belonging to the family Cephalodasyidae.

The species of this genus are found in Europe.

Species:

Mesodasys adenotubulatus 
Mesodasys brittanica 
Mesodasys hexapodus 
Mesodasys ischiensis 
Mesodasys laticaudatus 
Mesodasys littoralis 
Mesodasys rupperti 
Mesodasys saddlebackensis

References

Gastrotricha